The Tromsø Bridge is a cantilever road bridge in the city of Tromsø which is located in Tromsø Municipality in Troms og Finnmark county, Norway. It crosses the Tromsøysundet strait between Tromsdalen on the mainland and the island of Tromsøya.

History

Construction began in 1958 and the bridge was opened in 1960. Due to severe congestion issues, the mainland road connection was later reinforced by the construction of the Tromsøysund Tunnel in the 1990s. Unlike the tunnel, located almost  further north, the Tromsø Bridge leads directly to the city centre of Tromsø.

The Tromsø Bridge was the first cantilever bridge to be built in Norway. Since then, many bridges of this type have been built. The bridge is one of the most important landmarks of Tromsø, and forms part of a motif composed of the Arctic Cathedral, the Tromsdalstinden mountain, and the Tromsø Bridge. In 2000, the Directorate for Cultural Heritage protected the bridge against modifications. In 2005, the fencing was raised by two and a half meters, and seven years later, Norway's road authority planned on adding extra fencing onto many bridges to help prevent suicide.

References

External links

Bridges completed in 1960
Road bridges in Troms og Finnmark
Buildings and structures in Tromsø
1960 establishments in Norway
Roads within the Arctic Circle